William C. "Zuke" Supplee (December 21, 1903 – July 1966) was an American educator and college athlete. He attended the University of Maryland where he played college football and basketball for the Maryland Terrapins, and competed in track & field. In 1923, he received second-team All-America football honors, which made him the first Maryland player honored as such.

Early life and college
Supplee was born in Washington, D.C. In 1922, he enrolled at the University of Maryland. During his initial year, he competed on the freshman track and football teams. Supplee earned varsity football letters each of the next three seasons. In 1923, Supplee was named a second-team All-American by the Associated Press, which made him the first Maryland football player to receive All-America honors. His performances during the team's win against Penn and its narrow loss to period powerhouse, Yale, have been cited as the main reasons for his selection. He also received an All-America honorable mention from Walter Camp. In 1924, he was selected to the All-South Atlantic and the All-Maryland football teams, the latter of which was composed of the state's best players. Walter Camp again named Supplee an honorable mention All-American. In his final season in 1925, he served as the football team's captain.

Despite all of his athletic endeavors, Supplee excelled in his academic studies. One of his professors said of him, "To those who slander the American athlete as being a poor student and inferior intellect, I should like to point out Supplee as Maryland's refutation." Supplee graduated in 1926 with a Bachelor of Science degree in education.

Later life
He later earned a doctorate and served on the university's faculty as a chemistry professor in the 1940s and 1950s. He also served on the university's athletic board.

Supplee and his wife, Grace, had two daughters. He drowned in 1966 at Rocky Gorge Reservoir in Laurel, Maryland at the age of 63. His wife, Grace died in 2000. In 1982, Supplee was posthumously inducted into the University of Maryland Athletic Hall of Fame.

References

1903 births
1966 deaths
Maryland Terrapins football players
American male hurdlers
People from Washington, D.C.
Players of American football from Washington, D.C.
Maryland Terrapins men's basketball players
Maryland Terrapins men's track and field athletes
University of Maryland, College Park faculty
All-Southern college football players
Deaths by drowning in the United States
American men's basketball players